Oakwellgate railway station served the town of Gateshead, Tyne and Wear, England, from 1839 to 1844 by the Brandling Junction Railway.

History
The station was opened on 5 September 1839 by Brandling Junction Railway. It was a short-lived station, being open for less than five years before closing on 2 September 1844.

References

Disused railway stations in Tyne and Wear
Railway stations in Great Britain opened in 1839
Railway stations in Great Britain closed in 1844
1839 establishments in England
1844 disestablishments in England